Bjørnli is a village in the municipality of Orkland in Trøndelag county, Norway. The Løkken Church is located on the east side of the village, between Løkken Verk and Bjørnli.

The  village of Bjørnli has a population (2009) of 284.

References

Orkland
Villages in Trøndelag